The School of Visual Arts (Escola de Artes Visuais d Parque Lage - EAV) is a school for artists, curators, researchers and others in Rio de Janeiro.

History
Created by Rubens Gerchman in 1975, EAV is located in an historic mansion built in 1920's by architect Mário Vodrei, .

EAV hosted the "Como vai você, Geração 80?" exhibit in 1984, the "Rock Brasil" series of shows.  It has also staged Shakespeare's "The Tempest".  EAV is considered to have been a center of resistance during the Brazilian military dictatorship.

References

External links
Escola de Artes Visuais do Parque Lage

Art schools in Brazil